Clemente Polito (died 25 October 1606) was a Roman Catholic prelate who served as Bishop of Grosseto (1591–1606).

Biography
On 26 April 1591, Clemente Polito was appointed during the papacy of Pope Gregory XIV as Bishop of Grosseto.
He served as Bishop of Grosseto until his death on 25 October 1606.

References

External links and additional sources
 (for Chronology of Bishops) 
 (for Chronology of Bishops)  

16th-century Italian Roman Catholic bishops
17th-century Italian Roman Catholic bishops
Bishops appointed by Pope Gregory XIV
Bishops of Grosseto
1606 deaths